Adhura Milan is a Pakistani television series originally aired on A-Plus TV, co-written by Noorul Huda Shah and directed by Zulfiqar Ali. It stars Samina Peerzada, Faisal Rehman, Iffat Rahim, Aly Khan, Jana Malik and Kinza Hashmi in leading roles.

The serial was released on A-Plus TV originally where it was ended after 31 episodes with open-ended story. Subsequently, rights of the serial were bought by "See TV" in 2015 where it aired under the title "Milan" and ended its run after 50 episodes.

Cast 
 Samina Peerzada as Noor ul Ain / Bibi Jan
 Faisal Rehman/Asad Malik as Tabrez Alam
 Iffat Omer
 Usman Peerzada
 Aly Khan as Dilawar Akhtar
 Jana Malik
 Kinza Hashmi as Nayab
 Waseem Tirmazi as Shaan
 Nayyar Ejaz as Sultana
 Khalid Butt as Bakhtawar
 Hiba Aziz as Alishba
 Aamna Malick
 Sara Malik as Sugi
 Soha Malik

References 

2014 Pakistani television series debuts
Urdu-language television shows
Pakistani drama television series